Paul Dennis Reid, Jr. (November 12, 1957 – November 1, 2013), also known as "The Fast Food Killer", was an American serial killer, convicted and sentenced to death for seven murders during three fast-food restaurant robberies in Metropolitan Nashville, Tennessee and Clarksville, Tennessee between the months of February and April 1997. At the time of the murders, Reid lived with roommate Brian Fozzard at a boarding house, and he was on parole from a 1983 conviction in Texas on charges relating to the aggravated armed robbery of a Houston steakhouse. He had served seven years of a 20-year sentence, and was paroled in 1990. Originally from Richland Hills, Texas, a suburb of Fort Worth, Reid went to Nashville to pursue a career as a country music singer.

Crimes

Captain D's
On the morning of February 16, 1997, Reid entered a Captain D's on Lebanon Road in the Donelson neighborhood of Nashville, Tennessee before opening, under the guise of applying for a job. Once inside, he forced employee Sarah Jackson, 16, and the manager, Steve Hampton, 25, into the restaurant's cooler. Reid forced the two to lie face down on the floor and then shot them execution style. Money, including large amounts of change, was found missing from the cash register. Reid used the cash from this robbery as a down payment on a car two days later.

McDonald's
At gunpoint, he forced them back into the restaurant. Reid shot three employees to death execution style in the storeroom: Andrea Brown, 17; Ronald Santiago, 27; and Robert A. Sewell.

Reid attempted to shoot José Antonio Ramirez Gonzalez, but his weapon failed. Reid then stabbed Gonzalez 17 times and left him for dead. Gonzalez avoided further attacks by lying completely still and pretending to be dead. Reid then took $3,000 from the cash registers and fled. When the scene was discovered, Gonzalez was taken to a nearby hospital, treated, and ultimately survived. He eventually testified against Reid.

Baskin-Robbins
On the evening of April 23, 1997, Reid went to the door of a Baskin-Robbins on Wilma Rudolph Boulevard in Clarksville, Tennessee after closing and persuaded the employees to let him inside. Once inside, Reid kidnapped Angela Holmes, 21, and Michelle Mace, 16, and forced the two to Dunbar Cave State Park. Their bodies were discovered the next day at the park. Their throats had been slashed.

Trials
Reid was convicted on seven counts of first-degree murder across three trials. Jurors from West and East Tennessee were brought in and sequestered, because a judge determined that the overwhelming media coverage in Nashville would prevent the selection of an unbiased jury from Middle Tennessee.

Captain D's
In the Captain D's murders, Steve Hampton's driver's license and a video rental card were found in the median of Ellington Parkway in East Nashville with Reid's fingerprints on each. Reid was convicted on two counts of first-degree murder.

Baskin-Robbins
Witnesses also placed a vehicle similar to Reid's vehicle in the immediate area at the time of the crime. Blood evidence from the victims was found on his shoes. He was found guilty on two counts of first-degree murder. The Clarksville trial took place in the time between the two Nashville trials.

Sentences
Reid received seven death sentences for his convictions, the first two coming on April 20, 1999. Reid's execution was stayed several times in the years following, including an instance in 2003 just hours before the scheduled execution. Reid eventually waived his right to an appeal. Members of his family, along with anti-death penalty activists, claimed he was mentally handicapped and unable to make such a decision, and filed multiple motions (both successful and unsuccessful) to stay his execution. However, the Tennessee Supreme Court upheld all of Reid's sentences. Reid's case received national attention among anti-death penalty activists.

Reid resided at Tennessee's Morgan County Correctional Complex (Inmate #303893). His seven death sentences are the most ever handed down to a single person in the state of Tennessee.

His last execution date was scheduled for January 3, 2008, but was stayed on December 26, 2007 by US District Judge Todd J. Campbell, pending investigation into the constitutionality of Tennessee's lethal injection methods. The stay was part of a larger investigation, and not directly related to Reid's case. On April 16, 2008, the U.S. Supreme Court issued an opinion in a Kentucky case upholding the legality of execution by lethal injection. The state of Tennessee immediately began appealing stays of execution to resume death penalty cases, including Reid's.

Mental issues
After his arrest, Reid's family (notably his sister, Linda Martiniano) argued that he was mentally incompetent to stand trial. Following his convictions, they argued that he was not able to make sound legal decisions. Reid displayed erratic decision making, choosing to appeal some verdicts and not others, and professing his will to die as sentenced after having fought to avoid such a fate earlier in his defense. At the same time, Reid exhibited public signs of paranoia, calling his defense team "actors" and claiming he was part of a United States government mind-control project called "Scientific Technology" that monitored his every move. In cross-examinations, the prosecution attempted to counter this defense by claiming Reid was a crafty con artist using these "delusions" as a defense mechanism.

Other crimes suspected
For a time, Reid was considered a prime suspect in the 1993 Brown's Chicken massacre in Palatine, Illinois due to the similar nature of the crime in relation to the two incidents in Nashville. Characteristics included shoeprints found at the scene and descriptions of the killer that matched Reid's profile. His alibi checked out, however, and Reid was later ruled out as a suspect. Juan Luna was convicted on seven counts of murder in 2007. On September 29, 2009, Luna's cohort, James Degorski, was found guilty of all seven counts of murder. On October 20, 2009, Degorski was sentenced to life in prison. All but two of the jurors had voted for the death penalty. Reid was reportedly also considered a suspect in the Houston-area killings of three people in a bowling alley for which Max Soffar has twice been convicted.

Death

Reid died at Nashville General Hospital at Meharry, on November 1, 2013. The cause of death was from complications due to pneumonia, heart failure, and upper respiratory issues. Reid had been in the hospital for about two weeks.

See also 
 List of serial killers in the United States

References

External links
- Various legal documentation related to Reid case
- 2006 Tennessee Court of Criminal Appeals decision to uphold death sentences
- 2006 Tennessee Court of Criminal appeals dissenting opinion

1957 births
2013 deaths
American serial killers
American people convicted of murder
American prisoners sentenced to death
Male serial killers
People convicted of murder by Tennessee
People from Tarrant County, Texas
People from Fort Worth, Texas
People from Nashville, Tennessee
Prisoners sentenced to death by Tennessee
Prisoners who died in Tennessee detention
Serial killers who died in prison custody